Alexander Moinet Poots  (born 1967), is the founding chief executive and artistic director of The Shed in New York City. He was formerly the founding chief executive and artistic director of the Manchester International Festival (2005-2015) and the artistic director of Park Avenue Armory (2012-2015).

Early life and education
Alexander Moinet Poots was born in Edinburgh in 1967, to a French mother and an Irish father, and studied the trumpet from a young age. He earned a bachelor's degree in music from  City University London. He played trumpet on The Blue Nile album Hats.

Awards 
 2012 Diaghilev Award for The Life and Death of Marina Abramović
 2015 CBE in the Queen's Birthday Honours of 2015 for services to the arts

Personal life 
Poots is married to American sociology professor, and author of Religion and Nation, Dr. Kathryn Spellman-Poots. They have two children, a girl (born 2007) and a boy (born 2011).

Talk

References

External links 
 Manchester International Festival
 New York's Culture Shed

Alumni of City, University of London
Artistic directors
British chief executives
Commanders of the Order of the British Empire
Date of birth missing (living people)
Living people
Place of birth missing (living people)
1967 births